Louis Ferdinand Elle the Younger (1648 in Paris – 1717 in Paris), was a French portrait painter and the son of Louis Ferdinand Elle the Elder.

Biography
According to the RKD he was educated at the Académie de peinture et de sculpture, and moved after 1686 to the provinces, namely Nantes and later to Rennes. This was possibly due to the competition in portrait painting in Paris by the artists Nicolas de Largillière, Hyacinthe Rigaud, and François de Troy during his period of activity there.

Mimic Works
 Follower Of Louis Ferdinand Elle the Younger - Portrait of a Lady, Oil on Canvas
 Portrait of a Lady - Attributed To Louis Ferdinand Elle the Younger- Oil on Canvasa

References

Louis Ferdinand Elle the Younger on Artnet

1648 births
1717 deaths
17th-century French painters
French male painters
18th-century French painters
Painters from Paris
18th-century French male artists